The following is a comprehensive discography of Michael Schenker Group.

Discography

Studio albums

Cover albums

Live albums

Compilations and box sets

Videography

References

Discographies of British artists
Heavy metal group discographies